Steve or Stephen Francis is the name of:
Steve Francis (born 1977), American basketball player for the Houston Rockets
Steve Francis (footballer) (born 1964), English football goalkeeper
Steve Francis (businessman) (born 1954), American businessman and politician
Steven Francis, musician in Delusion Squared
Stephen Francis (murderer), one of the robbers cum murderers of the Gold Bars triple murders in Singapore

See also